Donar, also known as Donar Groningen, is a professional basketball club based in Groningen, Netherlands. The club competes in the BNXT League and its home arena is MartiniPlaza, which has a seating capacity of 4,350 people. 

Founded in 1951, Donar is one of the traditional first division clubs along with Den Bosch, as it entered the league  years ago. The club won the Dutch national championship seven times, six Dutch Cups and three Dutch Supercups. They have also been a regular in European competition, with their best result reaching the FIBA Europe Cup semi-finals in 2018.

The club has the most basketball fans in the Netherlands, with approximately 1,700 season ticket holders and sells the MartiniPlaza out on a regular basis in the playoffs. The MartiniPlaza is also the largest in-use basketball arena in the country. The traditional club colours of Donar are blue and white.

History
In 1881, gymnastics club Wodan and fencing club Mars, both part of the student corps Vindicat, merged to form GSSV Donar. In 1951 the basketball department of this club was founded. In 1970 the club promoted to the highest basketball league.

In 1973 the club separated from Vindicat and got their first sponsor, Nationale-Nederlanden. This allowed the team to play in the much bigger Martinihal "Events hall". On September 20, 1980, Donar won against BOB Oud-Beijerland with a score of 158–58. The score of 158 was repeated that same season against the same team (158–82) and never since. The difference of 100 points has never been repeated.

After the first championship in 1982, Nationale Nederlanden announced to stop as sponsor. After one year of playing under their name, Donar was demoted to the rayon league. Donar became champion that year and promoted to the promotion league. In 1986, Donar returned to the highest league; where they remained ever since. On February 1, 1991, the Basketball Business Club (BBC) was founded.
In 2000–01, the Martinihal was remodeled to become Martiniplaza and home games were moved to the new sports hall in the complex. This hall was renovated in 2006 when new seating was placed.

2009–2014: Successful GasTerra years

In 2009 GasTerra became the main sponsor of the club, that was renamed the GasTerra Flames. Head coach Marco van den Berg stayed and a whole new team was put together. In the 2009–10 season, Donar won the 3rd national championship in club history by beating West-Brabant Giants 4–1 in the Finals. Earlier, in the regular season, Flames finished in first place with a 33–3 record. The key players of the team were the Americans Matt Haryasz, Matt Bauscher, Jason Dourisseau and Robby Bostain.

The whole squad that won the 2010 title returned for the next season, except for Tim Blue. In 2010 they became the first Dutch basketball team to take part in the qualifying rounds of the new Euroleague. In the regular season Donar ended on the second place, while Jason Dourisseau was named the Dutch League MVP. The team won a second NBB Cup in 2011, after beating WCAA Giants The team did eventually lost in the DBL Finals to Zorg en Zekerheid Leiden 4–3 in an historic game 7 which included three overtimes.

Head coach Marco van den Berg left after the 2010–11 season and Hakim Salem, former ABC Amsterdam coach was acquired. The team brought experienced players to the team like David Bell and Alex Wesby but they couldn't meet the set expectations. In the cup competition, Flames was defeated in the quarterfinals and in the DBL semifinals it lost to EiffelTowers Den Bosch.

During the 2012–13 season Hakim Salem was fired and the Croatian coach Ivica Skelin was acquired. Despite the coaching change, team was still swept 3–0 by Zorg en Zekerheid Leiden in the DBL semifinals.

Before the 2013–14 season it was announced that GasTerra's sponsor contract ended after the season. Flames acquired Dutch top players Arvin Slagter and Ross Bekkering from defending champion ZZ Leiden and three new Americans were added to the team. On March 30, 2014 Flames won the NBB Cup by beating Zorg en Zekerheid Leiden 79–71.

In the 2014 Playoffs Flames beat BC Apollo easily in the quarterfinals (2–0) and later beat ZZ Leiden after a tough series (3–2). On June 1, 2014 Donar won its 4th national title. They beat SPM Shoeters Den Bosch 76–68 in game 7 of the Finals series.

2014–present: Donar
In the 2014 offseason, the club announced that in the previous season, a deficit of €135,000 had arisen after mistakes made regarding the budget. Therefore, the club had to cut into costs for the 2014–15 season and the budget was reduced. For the 2014–15 season, the club is known again as "Donar". The team won the Supercup against Leiden and the NBB Cup Final against Den Bosch, the DBL Finals were lost 4–1 against Den Bosch.

Braal seasons (2015–2020)

In the 2015 offseason, Ivica Skelin left the club and was replaced by Erik Braal who would go on to become the most successful coach in Donar history. In July 2015, former league MVP and club legend Jason Dourisseau returned to Donar. In the 2015–16 season, Donar won its 5th DBL title after beating Landstede 4–1 in the finals.

In the 2016–17 season, Donar reached the second round of the FIBA Europe Cup after being defeated by Tartu in the first qualification round of the Basketball Champions League. This feat would mean Donar's best European performance in club history. The 2016–17 season was also the first season ever to record the triple crown. New Heroes Den Bosch was defeated to win the Supercup, Landstede Basketbal was defeated in the NBB Cup final as well as in the playoff finals (4–1).

In the 2017–18 season, Donar qualified for the FIBA Europe Cup after being defeated in an overtime thriller against Estudiantes in the third and last qualification round of the Basketball Champions League. As a result of the loss Donar was drafted into a Europe Cup group with KK Bosna (Bosnia and Herzegovina), Le Portel (France) and Antwerp Giants (Belgium) in which they finished 2nd. By ending in second place they earned a spot in the second round phase of the Europe Cup, playingin group L against CS Universitatea Mobitelco Cluj-Napoca (Romania), Belfius Mons-Hainaut (Belgium) and Keravnos B.C. (Cyprus). After a home and away win against Cluj, a clear home win against Keravnos (109-69) and a convincing home win against Mons, Donar placed 1st in this group and, for the first time in club history, qualified itself for the Europe Cup play-off phase.

In the play-offs, Donar beat Cluj-Napoca in the round of 16 and Mornar Bar in the quarter-finals, to reach its first ever European semi-finals. In the semi-finals, Donar lost to the defending Italian champion Reyer Venezia, despite winning the second leg at home. In the 2017–18 DBL season, the club has success as well behind star players Brandyn Curry, named Most Valuable Player and All-DBL Selections Thomas Koenis and Evan Bruinsma. Donar won its third consecutive DBL title on 29 May 2018, after defeating ZZ Leiden 4–0 in the finals.

In the 2018–19 DBL season, Donar struggled and found itself in the fourth place in the regular season. It defeated ZZ Leiden in the semi-finals, 0–3. However, in the finals it lost to second-seeded Landstede. In the 2018–19 FIBA Europe Cup, Donar reached the round of 16 for the second time in history.

The 2019–20 season was cancelled prematurely in March because of the COVID-19 pandemic. Donar was supposed to play in the NBB Cup Final against Aris Leeuwarden. On 14 April, the club announced it parted ways with coach Braal.

Post Braal seasons (2020–present)
On 17 April 2020, Croatian coach Ivan Rudež signed a three-year contract as head coach. On 14 April 2021, Pete Miller was assigned as head coach replacing Rudež after disappointing results. He would finish the season and, after being eliminated 2-1 in the semifinals, return to being head of Donar's youth division.

On 24 May 2021, the club announced former player Matthew Otten as the new head coach. Otten just finished his first season as head coach in the Dutch Basketball League, making it to the Cup Final with Yoast United in their first season in existence. Starting from the 2021–22 season, Donar plays in the newly formed BNXT League, in which the national leagues of Belgium and the Netherlands have merged. Despite a disappointing regular season and an early elimination in Europe and the national play-offs, Donar managed to win its 7th cup this season. Additionally, the finals of the new BNXT Playoffs were reached.

After a disappointing start of the 2022–23 season, head coach Otten was fired and replaced by his assistant Andrej Štimac.

Club identity

Names
The club has a rich history of names, mainly because of the different main sponsors of the team. Despite having been named differently in the past, "Donar" has always been used by supporters to describe the team. Since 2014, the team plays under the non-sponsored name Donar.

 1951–1973 : GSSV Donar
 1973–1983 : Nationale-Nederlanden Donar
 1983–1986 : GBV Donar
 1986–1989 : Ahrend Donar
 1989–1993 : VGNN Donar

 1993–1995 : RZG Donar
 1995–1996 : Celeritas/Donar
 1996–1999 : RZG Donar
 1999–2003 : MPC Donar

 2003–2006 : MPC Capitals
 2006–2009 : Hanzevast Capitals
 2009–2014 : GasTerra Flames
 2014–: Donar

Logos
The Donar logo introduced in 2014 features eagles, inspired by the coat of arms of the city of Groningen.

Uniforms
Traditionally, Donar has played in white jerseys at home and in (navy) blue jerseys in away games.

Arenas

The MartiniPlaza is the current home arena of Donar, since 2001. The arena is owned by the municipality Groningen which has a cooperation agreement with the club.

Because of unavailability in 2017 for their European games, Donar played one game in Leek (against ESSM Le Portel) and one game in Leeuwarden (against Estudiantes).

The MartiniPlaza has a stand named after the club's legendary players Jason Dourisseau (since 2014) as well as after Thomas Koenis (since 2022).

Players

Current roster

Retired numbers

Notable players

 Leon Williams 
 Damjan Rudez 
 Teddy Gipson
 Jason Dourisseau
 Thomas Koenis
 Sean Cunningham
 Arvin Slagter
 Drago Pašalić 
 Brandyn Curry
 Evan Bruinsma
 Lance Jeter
 Chase Fieler
 Drew Smith
 Ross Bekkering
 Mark Sanchez
 Yannick Franke
 Maarten Bouwknecht
 Jessey Voorn
 Cashmere Wright
 Alex Wesby
 Avis Wyatt
 Matt Haryasz
 Torey Thomas
 Julian Khazzouh
 Chris McGuthrie
 Valmo Kriisa
 Travis Reed
 Rogier Jansen
 Kees Akerboom
 Mack Tuck
 Donell Thomas
 Jack Jennings
 Frank Ardon
 Martin de Vries
 John Franken
 David Lawrence
 Renso Zwiers
 Pete Miller
 Dragutin Čermak
 Jan Loorbach
 Hans Lesterhuis

Staff

Chairmen 

 Rob Schuur: (2008–2013)
 Jannes Stokroos: (2016–present)

Technical directors 

 Martin de Vries: (2012–2022)
 Drago Pašalić: (2022–present)

Honours
Total titles: 16

Domestic

Leagues
Dutch Basketball League
Winners (7): 1981–82, 2003–04, 2009–10, 2013–14, 2015–16, 2016–17, 2017–18
Runners-up (5): 1987–88, 2005–06, 2010–11, 2014–15, 2018–19

Cups
Dutch Cup
Winners (7): 2004–05, 2010–11, 2013–14, 2014–15, 2016–17, 2017–18, 2021–22
Runners-up (3): 1996–97, 1999–2000, 2006–07
Dutch Supercup
Winners (3): 2014, 2016, 2018
Runners-up (3): 2011, 2015, 2017

European
FIBA Europe Cup
Semi-finalist (1): 2017–18

Season by season

European record

Donar has played in Europe since the 1974–75 season, when it made its debut in the 1974–75. On 5 November 1974, Donar played its first European game away against Luxembourg club Etzella, winning 78–110.

Donar played in the qualifying rounds of the EuroLeague once, losing in the first qualifying round of the 2010–11 season to UNICS Kazan.
 
The best performance of the team was reaching the semi-finals of the 2017–18 FIBA Europe Cup, losing to Italian champions and later winners Reyer Venezia. Donar reached the knockout stage of the FIBA Europe Cup twice (2018 and 2019). They have played in the qualifying rounds of the Basketball Champions League five times (from 2016 to 2020), without qualifying.

Individual awards

Supporters club
The current supporters club was founded on August 26, 1997 under the name Vikings, a nod to the Norse god Donar (Thor). After the club lost Donar from its name, this link became less clear. In 2010 it was decided to change the name of the supporters club to SV Donar (Supporters club Donar). The supporters club had 330 members as of the start of season 2010–11.

List of head coaches

References

External links 

Official website 
Eurobasket.com Donar Page

 
Basketball teams established in 1951
Dutch Basketball League teams
Sports clubs in Groningen (city)
1951 establishments in the Netherlands